All Boy Scouts of America units are owned and operated by chartered organizations. Of the  units (Boy Scout troops, Cub Scout packs and Venturing crews)
and  youth members in 2010:
 65% of all youth members are chartered to faith-based organizations
 23.5% of all youth members are chartered to civic organizations
 11.5% of all youth members are chartered to educational organizations

Each unit is chartered by a local branch of an organization, not at the national level. The following tables combine all chartering organizations that fall into a religious denomination or national organization.

The following table lists chartered organizations (originally divided into faith-based groups, civic groups, then educational groups) by number of registered youth:

This table gives more information about which type of units are sponsored by which Chartered Organizations, but is more out of date than total units/total youth table:

References

Boy Scouts of America
Scouting-related lists